Drexeline station is a SEPTA Route 101 trolley stop in Drexel Hill, Pennsylvania. It is located near Woodland Avenue behind Drexeline Shopping Center in the Drexelbrook area. It is also located northeast of a bridge over Darby Creek near Indian Rock Park, a   Natural Environmental Park, containing picnic tables, playground equipment, and basketball courts. Drexeline is the closest stop on the entire Media-Sharon Hill trolley line system to US 1.

Trolleys arriving at this station travel between 69th Street Terminal in Upper Darby, Pennsylvania and Orange Street in Media, Pennsylvania. Free parking is available at this station, although it is primarily designed for patrons of the shopping center. Until the Springfield Mall opened in 1974, Drexeline was the only stop along the Media line that served a shopping plaza of any kind. Today at least four stops serve shopping centers, and two of them serve the same one in Media.

Station layout

References

External links

SEPTA Media–Sharon Hill Line stations